Super Hits is a compilation album by Big Audio Dynamite. The album was released on 4 May 1999.

Track listing
"The Bottom Line" (Mick Jones) – 3:46
"C'mon Every Beatbox" (Jones, Don Letts) – 4:32
"Rush" (Jones) – 4:17
"The Globe" (Jones, Gary Stonadge) – 3:47
"Just Play Music!" (Jones, Letts, Greg Roberts) – 4:12
"V. Thirteen" (Jones, Joe Strummer) – 4:40
"Sightsee M.C!" (Jones, Strummer) – 4:54
"Contact" (Dan Donovan, Jones) – 4:13
"E=MC²" (Jones, Letts) – 5:58
"Medicine Show" (Jones, Letts) – 6:32

References

Big Audio Dynamite albums
1999 greatest hits albums
Columbia Records compilation albums